Radiance is a radiometric measure of the amount of light in an area.

Radiance may also refer to:

Film and theater
 Radiance (play), a play by Louis Nowra
 Radiance (1998 film), a 1998 Australian independent film
 Radiance (2017 film), a 2017 Japanese film

Music
 Radiance / Chi ni Kaeru: On the Earth, a song by Mami Kawada
 Radiance (Jeff Tyzik album), a 1982 solo album by Jeff Tyzik
 Radiance (album), a solo piano album by Keith Jarrett

Novels
 Radiance (book), a novel by Alyson Noël
 Radiance, a novel by Carter Scholz
 Radiance, a novel by Louis B. Jones
 Radiance, a novel by Catherynne M. Valente

Other
 Radiance (fragrance), a fragrance by Britney Spears
 Radiance (software), a software suite, including a renderer, for lighting simulation
 Radiance-class cruise ship, class of cruise ships operated by Royal Caribbean
 , cruise ship
 The Radiance, a character in the video game Hollow Knight

See also
Radiant (disambiguation)